William Cowie (born 1 June 1926 in Glasgow, Scotland) is a former Scotland international rugby union player who later became a High Court judge. In his rugby career he played as a No.8.

Rugby union career

Amateur career

Cowie played rugby at Fettes where he played Centre. He attended Clare College, Cambridge after Fettes but his studies were interrupted by WWII.

In Glasgow, Cowie played and captained Kelvinside-West after the 2nd world war.

Kelvinside-West was a short term club merger fix for a post-war player shortage and as numbers increased the constituent clubs of Kelvinside Academicals and West of Scotland once again went their own ways. When that happened Cowie played for West of Scotland.

His legal work took him to Edinburgh and Cowie then played for Edinburgh Wanderers.

Provincial career

Starting off in Glasgow with Kelvinside-West, Cowie first represented Glasgow District and played for them against Edinburgh District in the Inter-City match.

Cowie played for Edinburgh District in the Inter-City and the Scottish Inter-District Championship.

He played for Edinburgh in the 1954–55 Scottish Inter-District Championship match against the South.

He is one of the few players of the era to play for both Glasgow District and Edinburgh District.

International career

He was capped for  once in 1953. He played in the Five Nations match against England at Twickenham Stadium on 21 March that year.

Law career

Cowie became a High Court judge.

He joined the Advisory Faculty of Advisers in Edinburgh in 1952, becoming an Advisory Depute in the Crown Office Scotland staying there till 1967. He was made Queen's Counsel in 1967. He reprised his role as Advisory Depute from 1969-77.

He became a Senator of the College of Justice in Scotland, staying in the role from 1977–94.

He then became a Judge of the Court of Appeal, Botswana from 1995–98.

References

1926 births
Living people
Scottish rugby union players
Scotland international rugby union players
Edinburgh Wanderers RFC players
Edinburgh District (rugby union) players
Kelvinside-West players
Glasgow District (rugby union) players
West of Scotland FC players
Rugby union players from Glasgow
Rugby union number eights